Novosti Nedeli (lit. News of the Week), sometimes shortened to Novosti, is an Israeli weekly newspaper geared at the Russian-speaking population of the country. Based in Tel Aviv, it is the oldest Russian-language weekly in Israel.

History
Novosti Nedeli started in 1989 by a group of olim from the Soviet Union. In 1990 it was purchased by a group of Israeli journalists, including Eli Azur.

The publication became a daily in 1990, and continued in this format until 2003. In 2008, it partnered with The Jerusalem Post, allowing it to translate some of the latter's articles in Russian.

Exposés
In 2001, Novosti Nedeli covered the issue of fraud against Russian-speaking olim, leading to a special parliamentary session on the matter.

Attachments
Multiple magazines have been attached to Novosti Nedeli, published by the same company. These include: Echo, Luch and Sekret.

Controversies
In 2003, the publication was sued by the publisher of Ogoniok, a Russian magazine, for plagiarizing 19 of its articles. Novosti Nedeli was ordered to pay a fine in 2007, totaling over ILS 315,000. In 2007, Novosti was handed a similar lawsuit by Kommersant, this time for ILS 4.64 million, for copying 232 articles.

Notable journalists
Knesset members Nino Abesadze and Marina Solodkin worked for Novosti Nedeli. Russian-Israeli-American journalist  also wrote for the newspaper.

See also
 List of newspapers in Israel
 Vesti (Israeli newspaper)

References

Ashkenazi Jewish culture in Tel Aviv
Russian-language newspapers published in Israel
Newspapers established in 1989
Mass media in Tel Aviv
Weekly newspapers published in Israel